Axel Brage (born January 11, 1989) is a Swedish professional ice hockey goaltender currently playing with Leksands IF in the Swedish Hockey League (SHL). He played as a youth and made his professional debut with Linköpings HC in the top-tier Swedish league Elitserien (SEL) during the 2010–11 Elitserien season.

References

External links

1989 births
Living people
Leksands IF players
Linköping HC players
Malmö Redhawks players
Örebro HK players
IK Oskarshamn players
IF Sundsvall Hockey players
Swedish ice hockey goaltenders
Tingsryds AIF players
IF Troja/Ljungby players
Växjö Lakers players
HC Vita Hästen players
Ice hockey people from Stockholm